Souad Bellakehal (born March 23, 1992) is a judoka who competes internationally for Algeria.

Achievement
Bellakehal won a silver medal at the 2015 All African Games in Brazzaville and another silver medal at the African Championships in 2014. She has 5 silver medals and 2 bronze medals.

References

Algerian female judoka

1992 births

Living people
Competitors at the 2022 Mediterranean Games
Mediterranean Games competitors for Algeria
20th-century Algerian women
21st-century Algerian women